Jaton is a genus of sea snails, marine gastropod mollusks in the subfamily Ocenebrinae of the family Muricidae, the murex snails or rock snails.

Species
Species within the genus Jaton include:
 Jaton decussatus (Gmelin, 1791)
 † Jaton dufrenoyi (Grateloup, 1845) 
 Jaton flavidus (Jousseaume, 1874)
 Jaton hemitripterus (Lamarck, 1816)
 Jaton sinespina Vermeij & Houart, 1996
 † Jaton sowerbyi (Michelotti, 1841) 
Species brought into synonymy
 Jaton angolensis Ryan, 1984: synonym of Jaton sinespina Vermeij & Houart, 1996
 Jaton rikae Petuch & Berschauer, 2019: synonym of Jaton hemitripterus (Lamarck, 1816)
 Jaton westsahariensis Franchi, 2007: synonym of Jaton hemitripterus (Lamarck, 1816)

References

 Nolf F. & Hubrecht S. (2020). A comparative study of the Jaton species in East Atlantic waters. Neptunea. 15(2): 11-36

External links
 Pusch, G. G. (1836-1837). Polens Paläontologie, oder Abbildung und Beschreibung der vorzüglichsten und der noch unbeschriebenen Petrefakten aus den Gebirgsformationen in Polen, Volhynien und den Karpathen, nebst einigen allgemeinen Beiträgen zur Petrefaktenkunde und einem Versuch zur Vervollständigung der Geschichte des Europäischen Auer-Ochsen. pp. 1-80
 Vermeij, G. J.; Houart, R. (1996). The genus Jaton (Muricidae, Ocenebrinae), with the description of a new species from Angola, West Africa. Iberus. 14(1): 83-91
 Barco A., Herbert G., Houart R., Fassio G. & Oliverio M. (2017). A molecular phylogenetic framework for the subfamily Ocenebrinae (Gastropoda, Muricidae). Zoologica Scripta. 46: 322-335

Ocenebrinae
Gastropod genera